Public Square Historic District may refer to:

Public Square Historic District (Scottsboro, Alabama), listed on the NRHP in Jackson County, Alabama
Public Square Historic District (Sigourney, Iowa), listed on the NRHP in Keokuk County, Iowa
Public Square Historic District (Watertown, New York), listed on the NRHP in New York

See also
 Public Square (disambiguation)